Archiv für Rechts- und Sozialphilosophie (English: Archives for Philosophy of Law and Social Philosophy) is a quarterly peer-reviewed academic journal of philosophy. It was established in 1907 and is the official journal of the Internationale Vereinigung für Rechts- und Sozialphilosophie. The journal is abstracted and indexed in the Index to Foreign Legal Periodicals, Index Philosophicus, FRANCIS, Russian Academy of Sciences Bibliographies, The Philosopher's Index, Répertoire Bibliographique de la Philosophie, International Bibliography of the Social Sciences, and PhilPapers.

See also 
 List of philosophy journals

External links 
 

Social philosophy journals
Publications established in 1907
Multilingual journals
Quarterly journals
Philosophy of law
Social philosophy literature